Sufe Bradshaw (born November 30, 1979) is an American actress, best known for her role as Sue, the secretary and scheduler with an acerbic wit, to Vice-President Selina Meyer, in the HBO comedy series Veep. Her prior acting credits include guest roles in Prison Break, Mind of Mencia, Southland, Cold Case and FlashForward, as well as a minor role in the 2009 feature film Star Trek.

Career 
A native of Chicago, Illinois, Bradshaw has also worked as a documentary filmmaker. Her project New Leaves, currently in development, examines children growing up in impoverished or underprivileged urban neighborhoods. She has also performed as a spoken word poet, and does humanitarian and activist work for groups including One Billion Rising and the Greenway Art Alliance.

Filmography

Film and TV Movies

Television

Awards and nominations

References

External links

Living people
American television actresses
American film actresses
American documentary filmmakers
African-American actresses
Actresses from Chicago
American spoken word artists
21st-century American actresses
1979 births
American women documentary filmmakers
African-American women musicians
21st-century African-American women
21st-century African-American people
20th-century African-American people
20th-century African-American women